The Allen Aircraft Engine Co. of Compton, a suburb of Los Angeles California, developed an eight-cylinder horizontally opposed aircraft engine during 1928–1929.

Little is known about this engine, other than that it was never given a Type Certificate and that it was not used on any known aircraft.

Specifications (O-675)

References

Aeroengines
Aerofiles.com
Ricardo Miguel, VidalLos Motores Aeroespaciales A-Z, (Spanish), 2002, p. 157, 

Air-cooled aircraft piston engines